Mudrīte is a Latvian feminine given name. The associated name day is October 24.

References

Latvian feminine given names